Cerquilho is a municipality in the state of São Paulo in Brazil. It is part of the Metropolitan Region of Sorocaba. The population is 49,802 (2020 est.) in an area of 127.80 km². The elevation is 595m.

References

Municipalities in São Paulo (state)